Lasiopetalum maxwellii is a species of flowering plant in the family Malvaceae and is endemic to the south coast Western Australia. It is a sprawling shrub with hairy young stems, lance-shaped to oblong leaves and white to cream-coloured flowers.

Description
Flowering mainly occurs from September to January.

Taxonomy
Lasiopetalum maxwellii was first formally described in 1881 by Ferdinand von Mueller in his Fragmenta Phytographiae Australiae from specimens collected by George Maxwell. The specific epithet (maxwellii) honours the collector of the type specimens.

Distribution and habitat
This lasiopetalum grows on sandy soils of granitic slopes in near-coastal areas of the Esperance Plains biogeographic area of southern Western Australia.

References

maxwellii
Malvales of Australia
Rosids of Western Australia
Taxa named by Ferdinand von Mueller
Plants described in 1881